PulseNet is a network run by the Centers for Disease Control and Prevention (CDC) which brings together public health and food regulatory agency laboratories around the United States. Through the network, cooperating groups can share pulsed field gel electrophoresis (PFGE) results which act as fingerprints to distinguish strains of organisms such as E. coli (O157:H7 and non O157), Salmonella, Shigella, Listeria, Campylobacter, Vibrio cholerae, Vibrio parahaemolyticus and Yersinia pestis. In this way, efforts to combat infectious disease outbreaks are strengthened. Specifically, by sharing results, it is easier to identify large-scale outbreaks. For example, if an outbreak of E. coli occurred in two distant parts of the country, PulseNet might help prove a link between the two. In such a case, the pathogen would have the same genetic fingerprint at both locations.

Due to the success of Pulsenet USA since its inception in 1996, similar networks have been established internationally in Canada (2000), the Asia Pacific (2002), Europe (2003), Latin America (2003), and the Middle East (2006). These networks collaborate under the umbrella of PulseNet International. PulseNet participants use the BioNumerics software suite for database maintenance, tiff image normalization, and analysis and pattern comparisons.

The objectives of PulseNet International are to perform molecular surveillance of foodborne diseases at the global level in order to facilitate international outbreak detection and investigation by partnering with public health laboratories throughout the world and by building capacity for molecular surveillance of foodborne pathogens.

Additionally, the participants collaborate on the development, validation and implementation of internationally standardized subtyping methods to be used in the networks and perform collaborative studies on the geographic distribution and spread of different clones of foodborne pathogens.

See also
 Pulsed field gel electrophoresis (PFGE)
 Infectious disease
 Outbreak
 Foodborne illness

References

Centers for Disease Control and Prevention